Who Goes There? is a 1938 science fiction horror novella by American author John W. Campbell, written under the pen name Don A. Stuart. Its story follows a group of people trapped in a scientific outpost in Antarctica with shapeshifting alien monsters able to absorb and imitate any living being. Who Goes There? was first published in the August 1938 issue of Astounding Science Fiction magazine and was also printed as The Thing from Another World, as well as included in the collection by the same title. Its extended novel version, found in an early manuscript titled Frozen Hell, was finally published in 2019.

Who Goes There? has been directly adapted to film in 1951 as The Thing from Another World by Christian Nyby and again in 1982 as The Thing, a more faithful treatment by John Carpenter. The story's many other adaptations and works inspired by it have spanned various media.

Plot
A group of American researchers, isolated in their scientific station in Antarctica towards the end of winter, discover an alien spaceship buried in the ice, where it crashed twenty million years before. They try to thaw the inside of the spacecraft with a thermite charge but end up accidentally destroying it when the ship's magnesium hull is ignited by the charge. They do recover an alien creature from the ancient ice, which the researchers believe was searching for heat when it was frozen. Thawing revives the alien, a being which can assume the shape, memories and personality of a living thing it devours, while maintaining its body mass for further reproduction. Unknown to them, the alien immediately kills and then imitates the crew's physicist, a man named Connant; with some 90 pounds of its matter left over it tries to become a sled dog. The crew discovers the dog-Thing and kill it in the process of transformation. Pathologist Blair, who had lobbied for thawing the Thing, goes insane with paranoia and guilt, vowing to kill everyone at the base to save mankind; he is isolated within a locked cabin at their outpost. Connant is also isolated as a precaution and a "rule-of-four" is initiated in which all personnel must remain under the close scrutiny of three others.

The crew realizes that they must isolate their base and therefore disable their airplanes and vehicles, yet they pretend that everything is normal during radio transmissions to prevent any rescue attempts. The researchers try to figure out who may have been replaced by the alien (simply referred to as the Thing), to destroy the imitations before they can escape and take over the world. The task is almost impossibly difficult when they realize that the Thing is shapeshifting and telepathic, reading minds and projecting thoughts. A sled dog is conditioned by human blood injections (from Copper and Garry) to provide a human-immunity serum test, as in rabbits. The initial test of Connant is inconclusive as they realize that the test animal received both human and alien blood, meaning that either Doctor Copper or expedition Commander Garry is an alien. Assistant commander McReady takes over and deduces that all the other animals at the station, save the test dog, have already become imitations; all are killed by electrocution and their corpses burned.

Everyone suspects each other by now but must stay together for safety, deciding who will take turns sleeping and standing watch. Tensions mount and some men begin to go mad thinking that they are already the last human or wondering if they could know if they were not human any longer. Ultimately, Kinner, the cook, is murdered and accidentally revealed to be a Thing. McReady realizes that even small pieces of the creature will behave as independent organisms. He then uses this fact to test which men have been "converted" by taking blood samples from everyone and dipping a heated wire in the vial of blood. Each man's blood is tested, one at a time and the donor is immediately killed if his blood recoils from the wire; fourteen men in all, including Connant and Garry, are revealed to be Things. The remaining men go to test the isolated Blair and on the way see the first albatross of the Antarctic spring flying overhead; they shoot the bird to prevent a Thing from infecting it and flying to civilization.

When they reach Blair's cabin, they discover that he is a Thing. They realize that it has been left to its own devices for a week, coming and going as it pleased as it is able to squeeze under doors by transforming itself. With the creatures inside the base destroyed, McReady and two others enter the cabin to kill the Thing that was once Blair. McReady forces it out into the snow and destroys it with a blowtorch. Afterwards the trio discover that the Thing was dangerously close to finishing the construction of a nuclear-powered anti-gravity device that would have allowed it to escape to the outside world.

Characters

Humans
Although the expedition based at Big Magnet comprises 37 members, only 16 are named in the story, and all but three by last name alone. By the end of the story, 15 of them have been replaced by alien impostors.
 Barclay: present at alien excavation.
 Benning: aviation mechanic. He survives. He appears in the 1982 adaptation renamed George Bennings with the occupation of meteorologist, and is portrayed by Peter Maloney.
 Blair: biologist, present at alien excavation. Blair goes insane after the Thing escapes, due to his desire to thaw the Thing. Blair is locked in the tool shed, where he is replaced by a Thing. Blair appears in the 1982 adaptation portrayed by A. Wilford Brimley.
 (Bart) Caldwell: a member of the team.
 Clark: dog handler. Clark is later revealed to be a Thing. He appears in the 1982 adaptation, played by Richard Masur.
 Connant: physicist, cosmic ray specialist. He is the first member of the team to be assimilated. In Frozen Hell, he is given the first name Jerry.
 Dr. Copper: physician, present at the alien excavation. Copper appears in the 1982 adaptation portrayed by Richard Dysart.
 (Samuel) Dutton: revealed to be a Thing.
 Garry: expedition commander. Garry is eventually revealed as a Thing and killed. Garry appears in the 1982 adaptation portrayed by Donald Moffat.
 Kinner: scar-faced cook. Kinner is later revealed to be a Thing.
 McReady: expedition second-in-command, meteorologist, present at alien excavation. McReady appears in the 1982 adaptation portrayed by Kurt Russell, now with the name "R.J. MacReady" and the occupation of the helicopter pilot. MacReady reappears in the video game played by Russell and in the comics based on the film.
 (Vance) Norris: muscular physicist. Norris appears in the 1982 adaptation portrayed by Charles Hallahan, though he is given Kinner's fate and much of Kinner's characterization.
 Pomroy: livestock handler.
 Ralsen: sledge keeper.
 Van Wall: chief pilot, present at alien excavation.

Non-humans
 "The Thing", the antagonist, is a malevolent, shapeshifting alien life form. It appears in all three film adaptions. In the first film (1951), the Thing is depicted as a tall, menacing humanoid alien that is composed of vegetable matter. In the two later film adaptions, the Things retain their ability to shapeshift, although they do not have telepathic abilities.
 Charnauk: lead Alaskan husky, first openly attacked by the Thing.
 Chinook and Jack: two other huskies.

Publication history
Two slightly different versions of the original novella exist. It was first published in Astounding Science Fiction in a 12-chapter version, which also appears in Adventures in Time and Space and The Antarktos Cycle: Horror and Wonder at the Ends of the Earth (under the title The Thing from Another World). An extended 14-chapter version was later included in The Best of John W. Campbell and the collection Who Goes There?.

In 1973, the story was voted by the Science Fiction Writers of America as one of the stories representing the "most influential, important, and memorable science fiction that has ever been written." It was promptly published with the other top voted stories in The Science Fiction Hall of Fame, Volume Two.

Frozen Hell
In 2018, it was discovered that Who Goes There? was actually a shortened version of a larger novel previously written by Campbell. The vastly expanded manuscript including an entirely different opening, titled Frozen Hell (another working title was Pandora), was found in a box of manuscripts sent by Campbell to Harvard University. The discovery was made by author and biographer Alec Nevala-Lee, during his research on a biography of Campbell and other authors from the Golden Age of Science Fiction.

A Kickstarter campaign was launched to publish the full novel. When completed on December 1, the campaign had raised more than $155,000, compared to its original $1,000 goal. An edited version of the two original drafts was published by Wildside Press under the full title Frozen Hell: The Book That Inspired The Thing, illustrated by Bob Eggleton and with a preface by Nevala-Lee and an introduction by Robert Silverberg. E-book versions of the novel began distributing digitally to campaign backers on January 16, 2019, with physical copies following in June the same year.

Adaptations and spin-offs

Films
The Thing from Another World (1951) is a loose adaptation of the original story. It features James Arness as the Thing, Kenneth Tobey as the Air Force officer, and Robert O. Cornthwaite as the lead scientist. In this adaptation, the alien is a humanoid invader (i.e., two arms, two legs, a head) from an unknown planet. A plant-based life form, the alien and its race need animal blood to survive. He, or rather it, is a one-alien army, capable of creating an entire army of invaders from seed pods contained within its body.

The John Carpenter 1982 adaptation The Thing, from a screenplay by Bill Lancaster, sticks more closely to Campbell's original story. Carpenter remade the film due to The Thing from Another World being one of his favorite films, and the 1951 adaptation featured on a television in Carpenter's original Halloween. Carpenter's idea was not to compete with the direction of the earlier film. In both the novella and this adaptation, the Thing can imitate any animal-based life form, absorbing the respective hosts' personalities and memories along with their bodies (although the telepathy aspect is omitted). When the story begins, the creature has already been discovered and released from the ice by another expedition. This version maintains the digestions and metamorphoses alluded to in the original novella, via practical effects such as animatronics. 

An early draft of Lancaster's screenplay was novelised by Alan Dean Foster in 1982 and released simultaneously with the film. Because it was an early draft, it featured several scenes that differed greatly from those found in the finished film, and two of the supporting characters have different names.

A prequel to the Carpenter version, also titled The Thing, was released in 2011.

William F. Nolan, author of Logan's Run, also wrote a Who Goes There? screen treatment for Universal Studios in 1978; it was published in 2009 in the Rocket Ride Books edition of Who Goes There?. Nolan's alternate take on Campbell's story reduced the number of characters and downplayed monster elements in favor of an "impostor" theme in a vein similar to The Body Snatchers by Jack Finney.

In January 2020, a new film was announced to be produced by Jason Blum's Blumhouse Productions and released and distributed by Universal Pictures (as a part of the former's first-look deal). The project is based on the Frozen Hell version of the story.

Literature
Héctor Germán Oesterheld and Alberto Breccia adapted the story as "Tres ojos" (Spanish: "Three Eyes") for their Sherlock Time series, published in the Argentine comic book Hora Cero (issues 89—104) from May to August 1959. In 1976, the story was also published in comic book form in issue 1 of Starstream with script by Arnold Drake and art by Jack Abel.

In 1991, Dark Horse Comics published a two-issue miniseries The Thing from Another World written by Chuck Pfarrer and drawn by John Higgins (comics). It was followed in 1992 by a four-issue sequel, Climate of Fear, written by John Arcudi. Standalone stories Eternal Vows and Questionable Research were further serialized in 1993-1994.

In 2010, Canadian science fiction writer Peter Watts published a short story titled "The Things" in which the alien entity from Who Goes There? is the first-person narrator. The characters and events are the same as those in the 1982 John Carpenter adaptation. In 2011, "The Things" was recorded and released by Escape Pod as an audio podcast.

In 2019, Wildside Press published Short Things, a collection of short stories inspired by Who Goes There? and The Thing. Edited by John Betancourt, Short Things features written contributions by G.D. Falksen ("Appolyon"), Paul Di Filippo ("Thingmaker"), Mark McLaughlin ("The Horror on a Superyacht"), Alan Dean Foster ("Leftovers"), Darrell Schweitzer ("The Interrogator"), Nina Kiriki Hoffman ("Good As Dead"), Kristine Kathryn Rusch ("A Mission at T-Prime"), Chelsea Quinn Yarbro ("The"), Kevin J. Anderson ("Cold Storage"), Pamela Sargent ("Two Wars"), Allen M. Steele ("According to a Reliable Source"), Allan Cole ("The Monster at World's End"), and Betancourt himself ("The Nature of the Beast"). It also contains illustrations by Dan Brereton, Marc Hempel and Mark Wheatley, among others.

, a novel-length sequel to Frozen Hell is being written by Betancourt.

Radio dramas
The story has been adapted as a radio drama multiple times, including by BBC Radio 4 in their Chillers series (24 January 2002), and the Suspense radio drama series (2013). The earliest adaptation was for the Exploring Tomorrow radio series in 1958 (under the title The Escape), hosted by John W. Campbell, Jr. himself; however, no recordings of this episode are known to exist.

Games
The Thing (2010 card game) and The Thing: Infection at Outpost 31 (2017 board game) are both based on the John Carpenter 1982 film. In 2002, Universal Interactive and Konami co-published the video game The Thing, a third-person shooter and survival horror sequel to the film.

Who Goes There?, a board game from Certifiable Studios, was released in May 2018, following a Kickstarter campaign, which raised over $612,000 compared to its $54,097 goal. In March 2020, Certifiable Studios launched a Kickstarter for a second edition of the game, promising updated mechanics and additional characters. It is available either as a complete game or as an add-on for those who have already bought the first edition.

Cultural impact

Literature
In December 1936, John W. Campbell himself had published a short story titled "Brain Stealers of Mars" in Thrilling Wonder Stories, which also features shape-shifting, mind-reading aliens. The earlier story has a humorous tone, but takes a philosophical note as members of another alien race describe living stoically alongside the shapeshifters.

Writer A. E. van Vogt was inspired by Who Goes There? to write Vault of the Beast (1940), which he submitted to Astounding Science Fiction. "I read half of it standing there at the news-stand before I bought the issue and finished it," van Vogt later recalled. "That brought me back into the fold with a vengeance. I still regard that as the best story Campbell ever wrote, and the best horror tale in science fiction."

The Thing is one of the aliens featured in Barlowe's Guide to Extraterrestrials (1979; second edition 1987). Barlowe's main illustration depicts the Thing halfway through its transformation into a sled dog.

The story is referenced, and embedded within The Rack of Baal (1985), a 'choose-your-own-adventure' gamebook written by Mark Smith and Jamie Thomson, about a time-travelling special agent called "The Falcon". A section of the plot plays out on a frozen world occupied by a single mining station crewed by only a few people. One inhabitant is one called 'Sil McReady', who, in a cynical inversion of the original story, actually turns out to be infected with the alien organism.

Film and television
David Denby of New York magazine suggested that Invasion of the Body Snatchers (1956) and Alien (1979) may have been influenced by Campbell's story.

The 1972 film Horror Express is loosely based on the story, with the alien being transferring from a preserved prehistoric corpse to humans while traveling on a train.

The 1976 serial "The Seeds Of Doom", which concluded the thirteenth season of the science fiction TV series "Doctor Who", combined elements from Campbell's original storyline (an expedition in Antarctica unearths an ancient alien specimen that has lain dormant in the ice for thousands of years) with elements of the 1951 film version (the alien is a carnivorous walking vegetable, not a shape-shifting impersonator).

The 1993 episode "Ice" of the science fiction TV series The X-Files borrows its premise from the storyline.

In the 1995 Star Trek: Deep Space Nine episode "The Adversary", a shapeshifting alien infiltrates the crew of a starship. The episode explores similar themes of paranoia and contains a "blood test" scene. The writers have cited The Thing from Another World as inspiration.

The 2013 episode "The Thingy!" of the family action-comedy series The Aquabats! Super Show! also borrows the story's premise, albeit in a much more comedic tone.

The fourth episode of the first season of the HBO crime drama True Detective, first broadcast in 2014, is named after the novella.

The 2020 film Friend of the World is influenced by The Thing with themes of body horror and isolation. A title on the soundtrack is named after the novella.

Other
In 2006, Dark Horse Comics released a pre-painted snap together model kit of the alien as described in the original short story. It was sculpted and painted by Andrea Von Sholly. The model was unlicensed and was simply titled 'The Space Thing'.

See also
 At the Mountains of Madness, an Antarctica-set science fiction horror story by H.P. Lovecraft that was also first published in Astounding
 Horror Express, a 1972 horror film which is similar to it.

References

Further reading
 
 
 Leane, Elizabeth. "Locating the Thing: The Antarctic as Space Alien in John W. Campbell's 'Who Goes There'". Science Fiction Studies. Volume 32, Issue 2, July 2005: 225–239 Literature Criticism Online. Web. 3 November 2011.
 Nevala-Lee, Alec (2018-10-23). Astounding: John W. Campbell, Isaac Asimov, Robert A. Heinlein, L. Ron Hubbard, and the Golden Age of Science Fiction. HarperCollins. .
 Witalec, Janet. "John Carpenter (1948–)." Contemporary Literary Criticism. Vol 161, 2003: 143–204 Literature Criticism Online. Web. 2 Nov. 2011.

External links
 

1938 short stories
American novellas
American short stories
English-language novels
Fiction about shapeshifting
History of science fiction
Horror short stories
Novels set in Antarctica
Science fiction short stories
Short stories adapted into films
Short stories by John W. Campbell
Works originally published in Analog Science Fiction and Fact
Works published under a pseudonym
The Thing (franchise)